Arthur Michaluk (May 4, 1923 – March 14, 2006) was a Canadian professional ice hockey defenceman. He was born in Canmore, Alberta.

He served in the Royal Canadian Air Force during World War II. Michaluk spent most of his career with the Providence Reds of the AHL. He also played with the Chicago Black Hawks of the NHL during the 1947–48 season. After he retired from hockey, he served on the Calgary police force for 23 years.

He died of cancer on March 14, 2006. Art was the brother of NHL hockey professional player, John Michaluk.

References

Art Michaluk's profile at Hockey Reference.com

1923 births
2006 deaths
Canadian ice hockey defencemen
Canadian military personnel of World War II
Canadian expatriates in the United States
Canadian police officers
Deaths from cancer in Alberta
Chicago Blackhawks players
Ice hockey people from Alberta
People from Canmore, Alberta
Pittsburgh Hornets players
Providence Reds players